Nikulino is a rural locality (a village) in Frolovskoye Rural Settlement, Permsky District, Perm Krai, Russia. The population was 5 as of 2010. There are 12 streets.

Geography 
Nikulino is located 37 km southeast of Perm (the district's administrative centre) by road. Zhebrei is the nearest rural locality.

References 

Rural localities in Permsky District